The Greater Copenhagen Authority ( often abbreviated HUR, literally: The Capital's Development Council) was a politically governed organisation deciding regional development plans for the Metropolitan Copenhagen area, Denmark. The council started work in July 2000 and was as well as the counties and the Copenhagen Hospital Corporation abolished in the Municipality reform of 2007.

It had six areas to run and develop:
public transport
regional and traffic planning
Oresund co-ordination and development
industrial policy
tourism
cultural life

Regional plan 2005
The regional plan for 2005 includes these development areas:
boost  recreational areas to get the world’s best
providing enough plots and building opportunities to ensure a rich and varied housing selection
better business environment
efficient infrastructure for all forms of transport

The plan was decided after well-attended public meetings.

Reform of 2007
Due to the Municipality reform of 2007 the traffic authority part of HUR was joined with the two other traffic authorities of Zealand, STS and VT, and renamed to Movia. The regional planning part of HUR is now governed by Region Hovedstaden, except for the former Roskilde Amt, which is part of Region Sjælland.

2000 establishments in Denmark
2007 disestablishments in Denmark
History of Copenhagen